Thomas Helland Larsen (born 20 April 1998) is a Norwegian cross-country skier.

At the 2016 Winter Youth Olympics he finished fourth in the 10 kilometre, won the silver medal in the cross-country cross event and the gold medal in the sprint event. Competing at the 2017 and 2018 Junior World Championships, his biggest success was the 2017 event where he won a gold medal in the 4 × 5 kilometre relay and the silver medal in the 10 + 10 kilometre skiathlon.

He made his World Cup debut at the March 2020 sprint in Konnerud, also collecting his first World Cup points with a 26th place. He improved to 21st in February 2021 in Ulricehamn. His definitive breakthrough came in December 2021 in Lillehammer, where he finished second in the sprint.

He represents the sports club Fossum IF.

Cross-country skiing results
All results are sourced from the International Ski Federation (FIS).

World Cup

Season standings

Individual podiums
1 podium – (1 )

Team podiums
 1 victory – (1 ) 
 1 podium – (1 )

References 

1998 births
Living people
Sportspeople from Bærum
Norwegian male cross-country skiers
Cross-country skiers at the 2016 Winter Youth Olympics